Taimani, also spelled Taimany and also called Proja-e-Taimany or Taimani Project, is a locality in north-western Kabul, Afghanistan. It forms part of administrative District 4. Taimani is located near Shahr-e-Naw, Kolola Pushta and Khair Khana.

Education
The Kardan University is located in Taimani. The Nazar Zulmai's Science and English Language Learning Center is located in this district.

Wedding halls
There are also a number of popular wedding halls in and around Taimani.

Postal code
The postal code of Taimani is 1007.

References

External links

Neighborhoods of Kabul